Gobbur (B)  is a village in the southern state of Karnataka, India. It is located in the Afzalpur taluk of Kalaburagi district.

Demographics
 India census, Gobbur (B) had a population of 7950 with 3895 males and 4055 females.

See also
 Gulbarga
 Districts of Karnataka

References

External links
 http://Gulbarga.nic.in/

Villages in Kalaburagi district